The Fujifilm X-T100 is a mid-range mirrorless interchangeable-lens camera announced on May 24, 2018. The X-T100 is largely based on the Fujifilm X-A5 and is nearly identical to the X-T20. It uses the Fujifilm X-mount.

The X-T100 is capable of recording video in 4K resolution with only 15 fps. The X-T100 is intended to be sold new either as the camera body only, or with the 15-45mm f/3.5-5.6 OIS PZ lens. The camera is available in 3 colors, black, dark silver and champagne gold and is styled after an SLR camera.

The X-T200 succeeds the X-T100. The new camera was announced on January 27, 2020.

Key features 
 24.2 Megapixels
 23.5 mm x 15.7 mm CMOS sensor (APS-C). Bayer filter array with no anti-aliasing filter. The same sensor as used in the Fujifilm X-A5, not a Fujifilm X-Trans sensor.
 Touch screen with 3-way tilt
 Selectable film simulations
 Hybrid autofocus
 Face detection
 Eye detection
 4K video
 4K Burst, 4K Multi Focus
 Wi-Fi connectivity
 Bluetooth connectivity
 Detachable grip

Features 

The X-T100 is a mirrorless compact camera with an anodized coated aluminum top cover measuring 121 mm x 83 mm x 47.4 mm and weighing 448 g including memory card and battery. Fujifilm state that 430 photographs can be taken with one battery. It includes a detachable grip for improved handling.

There are 3 dials available in addition to the mode dial. The left dial has no labels on it and its function can be defined by the user. Similarly the right dial has no label and its function changes according to the mode selected.

The X-T100 is equipped with a Bayer type color filter array with no anti-aliasing filter.

The camera has Wi-Fi connectivity complemented by Bluetooth for connection and tagging via a smartphone. It comes in three different colors, Dark Silver, Black and Champagne Gold.

Included accessories 

 Li-ion battery NP-W126S 
 AC power adapter
 Plug adapter
 USB cable
 Shoulder strap
 Body cap
 Owner's manual
 Detachable grip

References

External links

X-T100
Cameras introduced in 2018